Dominick J. Angiolillo is an Italian cardiologist.

Angiolillo attended Catholic University of the Sacred Heart Medical School, where he met Attilio Maseri. Angiolillo specialized in cardiology at the Complutense University of Madrid, and completed further training with Carlos Macaya. Angiolillo joined the University of Florida College of Medicine-Jacksonville in 2004. He is an ISI highly cited researcher.

References

Living people
Italian cardiologists
21st-century Italian physicians
20th-century Italian physicians
Università Cattolica del Sacro Cuore alumni
Complutense University of Madrid alumni
Italian expatriates in Spain
Italian expatriates in the United States
Year of birth missing (living people)
University of Florida faculty